Lomandra gracilis is a perennial, rhizomatous herb found in New South Wales and Queensland in eastern Australia.

References

gracilis
Asparagales of Australia
Flora of New South Wales
Flora of Queensland
Plants described in 1810
Taxa named by Robert Brown (botanist, born 1773)